is a railway station on the Iida Line in the city of Iida, Nagano, Japan, operated by Central Japan Railway Company (JR Central). It is the main station of the city.

Lines
Iida Station is served by the Iida Line and is 129.3 kilometers from the starting point of the line at Toyohashi Station.

Station layout
The station consists of a one ground-level side platform and one ground-level island platform connected by a footbridge.  The station has a Midori no Madoguchi staffed ticket office.

Platforms

Adjacent stations

History 
The line was nationalized on 1 August 1943. With the privatization of Japanese National Railways (JNR) on 1 April 1987, the station came under the control of JR Central.

Bus terminal

Highway Buses 
 Chūō Kōsoku Bus; For Shinjuku Station
 Chūō Kōsoku Bus; For Tachikawa Station, Akishima Station, Minami-ōsawa Station
 Bay Bridge; For Yokohama Station
 Misuzu Highway Bus; For Komagane, Ina, Matsumoto, and Nagano Station
 Chuodo Kosoku Bus; For Nagoya Station
 Alpen Ina; For Momoyamadai Station, Shin-Ōsaka Station, and Umeda Station

Passenger statistics
In fiscal 2016, the station was used by an average of 959 passengers daily (boarding passengers only).

Surrounding area
Iida Post Office
Iida Hospital

See also
 List of railway stations in Japan

References

External links

 Iida Station (JR Central) 

Railway stations in Nagano Prefecture
Railway stations in Japan opened in 1923
Stations of Central Japan Railway Company
Iida Line
Iida, Nagano